Intellectuals Are the Shoeshine Boys of the Ruling Elite is the debut album by Killdozer. It was originally released in 1984 through Bone Air Records, and reissued in 1989 by Touch & Go Records.

Critical reception
Maximumrocknroll wrote that "jazzy-metal instrumentation, extremely gruff vocals, and smart-ass lyrics are the hallmarks of this debut."

Track listing

Personnel
Killdozer
Michael Gerald – vocals, bass guitar
Bill Hobson – guitar
Dan Hobson – drums
Production and additional personnel
Steve Marker – production
Mike Tincher – design
Butch Vig – production
Bob Wasserman – photography

References

External links 
 

1984 debut albums
Albums produced by Butch Vig
Killdozer (band) albums
Touch and Go Records albums